The 2022 Maine State Senate election was held on Tuesday, November 8, 2022, with the primary election using instant-runoff voting being held on June 14, 2022, to elect the 131st Maine Senate. Voters in all 35 districts of the Maine State Senate elected elect their state senators. The elections coincided with the elections for Governor, U.S. House and the Maine House of Representatives. Republicans needed to gain five seats to win control of the chamber.

Background 
In the 2020 Maine State Senate elections, Democrats maintained control of Maine State Senate with the exact same number of seats.

Retirements

Democrats 
District 5: Jim Dill retired due to term limits.
District 12: David Miramant retired due to term limits.
District 13: Chloe Maxmin retired.
District 20: Ned Claxton retired.
District 21: Nate Libby retired due to term limits.
District 25: Cathy Breen retired due to term limits.
District 26: William Diamond retired due to term limits.
District 28: Heather Sanborn retired.
District 32: Susan Deschambault retired due to term limits.

Republicans 
District 4: Paul Davis retired due to term limits.
District 8: Kimberley Rosen retired due to term limits.
District 16: Scott Cyrway retired due to term limits.
District 33: David Woodsome retired due to term limits.

Predictions

Results

Summary of results 
Italics denote an open seat held by the incumbent party, bold text denotes a gain for a party.

Detailed results

District 1 
Incumbent Democrat Senate President Troy Jackson has represented the 1st district since 2016.

District 2 
Incumbent Republican Trey Stewart has represented the 2nd district since 2020.

District 3 
Incumbent Republican Bradlee Farrin has represented the 3rd district since 2018. The district also includes the home of incumbent Republican Scott Cyrway, who has represented the 16th district since 2014, however, most of Cyrway's constituents remained in the 16th district. Cyrway is also term-limited.

District 4 
The new 4th district includes the home of incumbent Republicans Paul Davis, who has represented the 4th district since 2014, and Stacey Guerin, who has represented the 10th district since 2018. Davis is term-limited.

District 5 
The new 5th district includes the home of incumbent Republican Russell Black, who has represented the 17th district since 2018.

District 6 
Incumbent Republican Marianne Moore has represented the 6th district since 2018.

District 7 
Incumbent Democrat Louis Luchini had represented the 7th district from 2018 until his resignation on January 18, 2022. A special election on for this seat on the same day as the regularly scheduled primary election for the 2022 elections.

District 8 
The new 8th district includes the home of incumbent Democrat Jim Dill, who has represented the 5th district since 2014. Dill is term-limited. Abe Furth and Mike Tipping are seeking the Democratic nomination. Eric Rojo and Grace Ann Tibbetts are seeking the Republican nomination.

District 9 
Incumbent Democrat Joe Baldacci has represented the 9th district since 2020.

District 10 
The new 10th district includes the home of incumbent Republican Kimberley Rosen, who has represented the 8th district since 2014. Rosen is term-limited. Robert Cross and State Representative Peter Lyford are seeking the Republican nomination.

District 11 
Incumbent Democrat Chip Curry has represented the 11th district since 2020.

District 12 
Incumbent Democrat David Miramant has represented the 12th district since 2014. Miramant is term-limited.

District 13 
Incumbent Democrat Chloe Maxmin has represented the 13th district since 2020. Cameron Reny defeated David Levesque in the Democratic primary.

District 14 
Incumbent Democrat Craig Hickman has represented the 14th district since 2021.

District 15 
Incumbent Republican Matthew Pouliot has represented the 15th district since 2018.

District 16 
The new 16th district overlaps with much of the former 16th district, though its incumbent Scott Cyrway had his home drawn into the 3rd district. Mike Perkins defeated Mark Andre and Kevin Kitchin in the Republican primary.

District 17 
The new 17th district includes the home of incumbent Republican Minority Leader Jeffrey Timberlake, who has represented the 22nd district since 2018.

District 18 
The new 18th district includes the home of incumbent Republican Rick Bennett, who has represented the 19th district since 2020.

District 19 
The new 19th district includes the home of incumbent Republican Lisa Keim, who has represented the 18th district since 2016.

District 20 
Incumbent Democrat Ned Claxton has represented the 20th district since 2018. Claxton isn't seeking re-election.

District 21 
Incumbent Democrat Nate Libby has represented the 21st district since 2014. Libby is term-limited.

District 22 
The new 22nd is an open seat which is expected to favor Republicans.

District 23 
The new 23rd district includes the home of incumbent Democrat Mattie Daughtry, who has represented the 24th district since 2020.

District 24 
The new 24th district includes the home of incumbent Democrat Eloise Vitelli, who has represented the 23rd district since 2016.

District 25 
Incumbent Democrat Cathy Breen has represented the 25th district since 2014. Breen is term-limited.

District 26 
Incumbent Democrat Bill Diamond has represented the 26th district since 2014. Diamond is term-limited.

District 27 
The new 27th district includes the home of incumbent Democrat Heather Sanborn, who has represented the 28th district since 2018. Sanborn isn't seeking re-election. Jill Duson is the Democratic nominee.

District 28 
The new 28th district includes the home of incumbent Democrat Ben Chipman, who has represented the 27th district since 2016.

District 29 
Incumbent Democrat Anne Carney has represented the 29th district since 2020.

District 30 
Incumbent Democrat Stacy Brenner has represented the 30th district since 2020.

District 31 
Incumbent Democrat Donna Bailey has represented the 31st district since 2020.

District 32 
Incumbent Democrat Susan Deschambault has represented the 32nd district since 2016. Deschambault is term-limited.

District 33 
Incumbent Republican David Woodsome has represented the 33rd district since 2014. Woodsome is term-limited.

District 34 
Incumbent Democrat Joe Rafferty has represented the 34th district since 2020.

District 35 
Incumbent Democrat Mark Lawrence has represented the 35th district since 2018.

See also 
 2022 Maine elections

References 

State Senate
Maine State Senate
Maine Senate elections